This is a list of World War II U-boat commanders. Only sunk merchant ships are counted in the totals; warships and damaged ships are not.

Submariners suffered the highest casualty rate in the German military: 75%. Commanders killed in action are indicated by a  after their name.

References

Lists of German military personnel